The PooPoo PeePee Tour was a concert tour by rock band Blink-182, Launched in support of the group's 1997 album Dude Ranch, the tour visited clubs and theaters in the summer/fall of 1998. It was the first major tour with drummer Travis Barker, who replaced original drummer Scott Raynor midway through a summer tour. Supporting acts included Unwritten Law and Home Grown. On October 1, 1998, the tour merged for one night only with the ongoing Reel Big Fish, Spring Heeled Jack and Frenzal Rhomb tour at the Hunka Bunka Ballroom in Sayreville, New Jersey.

Supporting acts
The Ataris (July 27–28)
MxPx (August 4–23)
Loose Nuts (August 22–23)
Home Grown (July 28–30, August 2–23)
Jimmy Eat World (July 28–30, August 2–6)
Wade (August 9–23)
The Vandals (September 25–26)
Unwritten Law (October 2–25)
Assorted Jelly Beans (October 2–25)
Riverfenix (October 4–25)
Reel Big Fish (October 1)
Spring Heeled Jack (October 1)
Frenzal Rhomb (October 1)

Tour dates

Festivals and other miscellaneous performances

This concert was a part of Big Stink '98
This concert was a part of Endfest '98

Notes

References

External links
 

Blink-182 concert tours
1998 concert tours